Leana is a feminine given name. Notable people with the name include:

 Leana de Bruin (born 1977), South African and New Zealand netball player
 Leana Wen (born 1983), American physician and public health advocate

See also
 Lena (name)

Feminine given names